Poorvi Koutish (born 3 January 1994 in Chandigarh, Punjab) is an Indian singer, song-writer, actress and music producer. She was one of the top 4 final contestants in India's biggest musical reality show Indian Idol 6.

Television
Indian Idol 6 as Contestant

Discography 
List of (film/non-film) songs recorded by Poorvi Koutish.

Filmography

Films
| 2023
|Ho Ja Mukt
| Sherry Khambatta

References

 

1994 births
Living people
Indian Idol participants